Ascham School is an independent, non-denominational, day and boarding school for girls, located in Edgecliff, an Eastern Suburb of Sydney, New South Wales, Australia.

Established in 1886, the school has a non-selective enrolment policy and currently has approximately 1000 students from Kindergarten to Year 12, including 100 boarders from Years 6 to 12.

Ascham follows the 'Dalton Plan', an educational philosophy created by Helen Parkhurst in 1916. The 'Dalton Plan' aims to produce independent and confident leaders.

Ascham is a member of the Alliance of Girls' Schools Australasia (AGSA), the Junior School Heads Association of Australia the Association of Heads of Independent Schools of Australia (AHISA), the Australian Boarding Schools' Association, and the  Association of Heads of Independent Girls' Schools (AHIGS).

Ascham is operated as a not-for-profit company. All funds must be used to benefit the school. This function is administered by the school's Council of Governors who are elected by the school's members.

History
Ascham school was established in 1886 by Marie Wallis, as a private, day and boarding school for girls, in a terrace house in Darling Point. The school moved to its current site following the acquisition of Glenrock estate in 1911. The school was named after Roger Ascham, tutor to Queen Elizabeth I.

The school adopted the 'Dalton Plan' as its method of teaching in 1922.

Ascham became a company, Ascham School Limited, in 1937 under the direction of Headmistress Margaret Bailey. This transferred ownership of the school from herself to ensure the long-term succession of the school.

School crest
The Ascham school crest was developed in 1911 by Ascham art teacher, Albert Collins. Symbols on the crest were explained in the school's Charivari magazine in December 1911: the dolphins symbolise energy, persistence and the ability to swim against, as well as with, the tide; the wings suggest aspiration and ambition; the lamp and book represent learning; and the combination of the acorn and eucalyptus seed mark the historical union of Britain and Australia.

Campus
Ascham is composed of three school areas designed to accommodate for the different stages of the students' educational development.

Infant School
The youngest students, from Preparatory to Year 2, are taught in the Hillingdon building which has its own hall, library, classrooms and recreation area. The students at Hillingdon are taught according to the Spalding Method.

Junior School
Students from Years 3 to 6 live in the Fiona building. Junior School students have access to a broad range of school subjects and co-curricular activities.

Senior School
The senior school is for students from Year 7 to Year 12. They are taught according to the Dalton Plan. This method gives the older students increased flexibility while placing on them the responsibility to learn and participate in the school's numerous academic and cultural opportunities. The campus hosts the Packer Theatre, a studio theatre, an indoor heated pool, a gymnasium, tennis courts, playing fields, IT facilities, art rooms, science laboratories and three libraries.

Exchange programme
Ascham has exchange programmes with the following girls schools: St Mary's Calne, UK; City of London School for Girls in London; Havergal College in Toronto; Nightingale-Bamford School in New York; Northlands School in Buenos Aires; Durban Girls' College in Durban; Institut de la Tour in Paris, St. George's School, Edinburgh, Scotland.

Heads
The following individuals have served as Head of School, or preceding title:

Former students

Old Girls' Union
The Ascham Old Girls' Union (AOGU) was founded in 1899 by former students of the school. It now has a membership of over 4,000 alumnae. The AOGU encourages involvement of all past students in the Ascham community and helps alumnae remain in contact with their classmates. The AOGU also funds bursaries for the daughters and granddaughters of past students. The recipients of bursaries are means-tested and reviewed annually, and also carry an obligation to uphold the ideals and values of Ascham. The AOGU released three publications per year to its members.

Notable alumnae

Arts

Creative arts
 Penny Meagher (1935–1995), a painter

Literary arts
 Marguerite Dale (1883–1963), a playwright and feminist
 Mia Freedman (1971– ), a journalist
 Sheridan Jobbins (1960– ), a journalist, presenter and screenwriter
 Jill Kitson (1939–2013), a literary journalist and broadcaster
 Sharri Markson (1984– ), a journalist
 Saturday Rosenberg (1952–1998), screenwriter and comedian
 Debbie Whitmont, a journalist

Performing arts
 Sylvia Breamer (1897–1943), an actress
 Marta Dusseldorp (1973– ), an actress
 Joanna McCallum (1950– ), an actress
 Poppy Montgomery (1972– ), an actress
 Lesley Piddington (1925–2016)
 Wendy Playfair (1926– ), an actress
 Lynn Rainbow  (1942– ), an actress
 Ann Richards (1917–2006), an actress and author
 Leila Waddell (1880–1932), a violinist and magician
 Arkie Whiteley (1964–2001), an actress
 Betty Who (1991– ), a singer and songwriter
 Constance Worth (1911–1963), an actress

Business
 Belinda Hutchinson  (1953– ), a businessperson and philanthropist
 Lisa Messenger (1971– ), an entrepreneur and author
 Gretel Packer  (– ), an investor and philanthropist
 Lady Primrose Potter  (1931– ), a philanthropist
 Allegra Spender (1978– ), a businessperson and politician
 Shemara Wikramanayake (1962– ), a businessperson

Education
 Joan Bernard (1918–2012), the founding principal of Trevelyan College, University of Durham

Medicine and the sciences
 Ann Parker
 Nan Waddy  (1915–2015), a psychiatrist and mental health advocate

Sport
 Nikki Bishop (1973– ), an equestrian event rider who competed in the 1996 Summer Olympics
 Gillian Campbell (1960– ), a rower who competed at the 1992 Summer Olympics
 Paige Campbell (1996– ), a steeplechase athlete
 Lavinia Chrystal (1989– ), a skier who competed at the 2014 Winter Olympics
 Christine Davy  (1934– ), a skier who competed at the 1956 and 1960 Winter Olympics
 Kitty Mackay Hodgson (1915–1974), a swimmer who competed in the 1936 Summer Olympics
 Vicki Rose Roycroft (1953– ), an equestrian rider who competed at the 1984, 1988, and 1996 Summer Olympics

See also
 List of non-government schools in New South Wales
 List of boarding schools

References

Further reading

External links

 

Girls' schools in New South Wales
Boarding schools in New South Wales
Educational institutions established in 1886
Private primary schools in Sydney
Association of Heads of Independent Girls' Schools
Junior School Heads Association of Australia Member Schools
1886 establishments in Australia
Alliance of Girls' Schools Australasia
Private secondary schools in Sydney